Kendall James (born June 29, 1992) is a former American football cornerback. He was drafted by the Minnesota Vikings in the sixth round of the 2014 NFL Draft. He played college football at Maine.

High school
James attended the Union County Academy for Information Technology in Scotch Plains, New Jersey. While playing for Abraham Clark High School in Roselle, New Jersey, he earned all-conference and all-league honors during both his junior and senior seasons, and helped lead his team to its first winning record in 10 years in 2007. He set the school record with a 103-yard interception return for a touchdown. He also played basketball, where he was a three-year starter at point guard helping lead his team to a sectional championship during his junior season. He also ran track and helped lead his team to a state title his junior season.

He was considered a two-star recruit by Scout.com.

College career
James attended the University of Maine, where he was a member of the Maine Black Bears football team from 2009 to 2013. During his career, he accumulated 136 tackles, nine interceptions, 25 pass break-ups and three forced fumbles. He earned All-Colonial Athletic Association honors twice; a third-team selection in 2011, and a first-team selection in 2013. He was also named a second-team FCS All-American by the Associated Press.

Professional career

2014 NFL Combine

2014 NFL Draft
He was drafted by the Minnesota Vikings in the sixth round (184th overall) of the 2014 NFL Draft.

Minnesota Vikings
On May 16, 2014, James signed his rookie contract with the Minnesota Vikings. On August 30, 2014, he was released by the Vikings. On the following day, he cleared waivers and was signed to the Vikings' practice squad.

Cleveland Browns
On December 3, 2014, James was signed by the Cleveland Browns. On September 5, 2015, he was waived by the Browns. On the following day, he cleared waivers and was signed to the Browns' roster.

Detroit Lions
James was signed by the Detroit Lions on December 15, 2015.

New York Jets
James was signed to a reserve/future contract by the New York Jets on January 8, 2016. James was waived/injured on August 3, 2017 after being placed on the physically unable to perform list at the start of training camp.

San Diego Fleet
On October 26, 2018, James signed with the San Diego Fleet. The league ceased operations in April 2019.

References

External links
Maine Black Bears bio

1992 births
Living people
Abraham Clark High School alumni
American football cornerbacks
BC Lions players
Cleveland Browns players
Maine Black Bears football players
Minnesota Vikings players
New York Jets players
People from Roselle, New Jersey
Players of American football from New Jersey
San Diego Chargers players
San Diego Fleet players
Sportspeople from Union County, New Jersey